Budapesti MÁVAG Sport Kör was a Hungarian football club from the town of Budapest. The club was founded by the workers of MÁVAG.

History
Budapesti MÁVAG Sport Kör debuted in the 1917–18 season of the Hungarian League and finished ninth.

Name Changes 
1910–1932: MÁV Gépgyári Sport Kör
1932–1951: MÁVAG Sport Kör
1951–1956: Vasas MÁVAG Sport Kör
1956–1959: Budapesti MÁVAG
1959: merger with Vasas Ganzvagon

References

External links
 Profile

Football clubs in Hungary
1910 establishments in Hungary